Mátrafüred is a village located in an outer part of Gyöngyös in Heves county, Hungary in the southern part of the Mátra mountain range. It can be found by travelling on the road 24, which crosses the commune.
It has a population of 981.

History 

A fortress was built at Mátrafüred around at 1000 and used to be the most powerful fortress in Mátra, It was destroyed in the Mongol Invasion and was rebuilt in the 14th century but was destroyed by Hussite forces around 1450.
The village itself (then called Bene) was first mentioned in 1301. The village church was built in 1767, and a stone cross was
erected in 1833. There were baize manufactures near Bene, but they could not compete with larger factories, so Bene was depopulated in the second half of the 19th century. Around 1887 look-out towers and tourist houses were built nearby. People started to move to the town, which was renamed Mátrafüred in 1893. In the 1920s several villas were built. Railways near Mátrafüred were restored and new tracks were built. In 1976, a large and comfortable hotel was opened.
In a referendum held in 2005, the people of Mátrafüred voted to split from Gyöngyös, but it didn't happen yet.

Tourism 

It is the centre of tourism in Mátra. There are several hotels and bungalows.
Sights include:
Sástó - A lake
Kozmáry look-out tower
Palóc Folk Art Museum
Baroque church

Populated places in Heves County